The Last Cartridges (also released as Bombardement d'une Maison; Star Film Catalogue no. 105) is an 1897 French short silent war film directed by Georges Méliès, based on the 1873 painting of the same name by Alphonse de Neuville. The film recreates the defense of a house at Bazeilles, on September 1, 1870 at the Battle of Sedan during the Franco-Prussian War.

The film was a great success and inspired the Lumière, Pathé and Gaumont studios to film imitations.

Synopsis
A group of soldiers attempt to defend a derelict house, where a nun cares for their wounded, but the house is bombed as they fire the last of the rounds of ammunition they have gathered from the floor.

References

External links 
 
 SilentEra entry for Lumiere version, stating this was one of the earliest hand-coloured films
 

1897 films
1897 short films
1890s war films
Films directed by Georges Méliès
Films set in 1870
Franco-Prussian War films
French black-and-white films
French silent short films
French war films
Silent war films
1890s French films
1890s French-language films